Rubén Cruz Gil (born 13 October 1985) is a Spanish footballer who plays for Recreativo de Huelva as a left winger.

Club career
Cruz was born in Utrera, Seville, Andalusia. A Real Betis' youth graduate, he made senior debuts with the C-team, and later spent several seasons with the reserves in Tercera División and Segunda División B.

In the 2010 summer Cruz moved to neighbouring Unión Estepona CF. He continued to appear in the third level in the following years, representing UD Melilla, Écija Balompié and Albacete Balompié. With the latter he achieved promotion to Segunda División, scoring a career-best 26 goals in 39 matches.

On 24 August 2014 Cruz played his first match as a professional, replacing Chumbi and scoring his side's last of a 2–3 home loss against AD Alcorcón. He finished the campaign as the club's top goalscorer, with ten goals in 37 appearances.

On 5 August 2016, after Alba's relegation, Cruz signed a one-year contract with Cádiz CF still in the second division. On 15 January 2018, he moved to FC Cartagena in the third level.

References

External links

Beticopedia profile 

1993 births
Living people
People from Utrera
Sportspeople from the Province of Seville
Spanish footballers
Footballers from Andalusia
Association football wingers
Segunda División players
Segunda División B players
Tercera División players
Real Betis players
UD Melilla footballers
Écija Balompié players
Albacete Balompié players
Cádiz CF players
FC Cartagena footballers
Recreativo de Huelva players